Mustafa Varank (pronounced [mustafäh väränk]; 1 January 1976) is currently the Minister of Industry and Technology in the Republic of Turkey.

Background 
He was born in 1976 in the Of District of the Black Sea city of Trabzon.  He attended primary school in Yedikule Ilkokulu and continued to secondary school at Istanbul's Imam-Hatip High School.  In 1999, he completed his higher education in Middle East Technical University (Ankara), where he earned degrees in Political Science and Public Administration, after which he began his tenure in the United States.  
 
There, he proceeded to Florida State University and Florida Atlantic University College of Engineering and Computer Science where he worked as a researcher and systems engineer.  He left the Sunshine State to then earn his master's degree at Indiana University's Pervasive Technology Institute.
 
Varank is married and the father of two children.  He is the recipient of many awards and honors, including the honorary title of "Ambassador", awarded to him by the President in 2016.

References 

1976 births
Living people
Imam Hatip school alumni
Florida Atlantic University alumni
Florida State University alumni
Ministers of Science Industry and Technology of Turkey
Indiana University alumni
Middle East Technical University alumni
People from Of, Turkey
Members of the 66th government of Turkey